Emily Will Know is a 1949 crime novel by the American writer . It had previously appeared in the Saturday Evening Post in a shorter version under the title Murder for Millions. It was published in France the following year.

Film adaptation
In 1956 it was adapted into the French film noir The Wages of Sin directed by Denys de La Patellière and starring Danielle Darrieux, Jean-Claude Pascal and Jeanne Moreau.

References

Bibliography
 Gray, Marianne.  La Moreau: A Biography of Jeanne Moreau. Donald I. Fine Books, 1996.
 Nehr, Ellen. Doubleday Crime Club Compendium, 1928-1991. Offspring Press, 1992.
Walker-Morrison, Deborah. Classic French Noir: Gender and the Cinema of Fatal Desire. Bloomsbury Publishing, 2020.

1949 American novels
American crime novels
American novels adapted into films
Doubleday (publisher) books